Lisa Boattin (born 3 May 1997) is an Italian professional footballer who plays as a left back for Serie A club Juventus FC and the Italy women's national team.

Club career
In July 2014, Boattin signed for Brescia. In November 2017, she scored her first goal for Juventus, a penalty against Res Roma. She made two appearances for Juventus in the 2018–19 UEFA Women's Champions League. She played for Juventus in the 2018–19 Italian Women's Cup final. Juventus beat Fiorentina 2–1. In May 2019, Boattin extended her contract with Juventus until 2021. She started every match of Juventus' title-winning 2020–21 Serie A season, and was voted the fan's player of the season. On 15 July 2021, she extended her contract until 2023. On 30 January 2022, Boattin scored a goal directly from corner kick in the third minute of the stoppage time to draw 1–1 in a Coppa Italia match against Inter. In 2022, she was the Serie A Female Footballer of the Year.

International career
Boattin captained Italy U17 at the 2014 UEFA Women's Under-17 Championship and 2014 FIFA U-17 Women's World Cup. Italy U-17 came third at both events, and Boattin scored in a penalty shootout at the World Cup, as Italy beat Venezuela U-17.

She played for Italy in two matches in the qualification for the 2019 FIFA Women's World Cup. In May 2019, she was named in the squad for the 2019 FIFA Women's World Cup in France. She was one of eight Juventus players in the squad.

After taking part in the UEFA Women's Euro 2022, where Italy got eliminated in the group stage, Boattin was also involved in the final matches of the qualifiers to the 2023 FIFA Women's World Cup in Australia and New Zealand. On 6 September 2021, she scored her first goal for the Italian senior national team with a 22-yard strike, as she sealed a 2-0 home win against Romania: thanks to this result, the Azzurre gained direct qualification to the second World Cup in a row for the first time in their history.

International goals

Personal life
Boattin was born in Portogruaro, Veneto, Italy.

Boattin lives together with Swedish footballer Linda Sembrant in a same-sex relationship.

Honours 
Brescia
 Serie A: 2015–16
 Coppa Italia: 2015–16
 Supercoppa Italiana: 2015, 2016

Juventus
 Serie A: 2017–18, 2018–19, 2019–20, 2020–21, 2021–22
 Coppa Italia: 2018–19, 
 Supercoppa Italiana: 2019, 2020–21, 2021–22

Individual
Serie A Female Footballer of the Year: 2022

References

External links 

 

1997 births
Living people
Italy women's international footballers
Italian women's footballers
Juventus F.C. (women) players
2019 FIFA Women's World Cup players
Women's association football defenders
A.C.F. Brescia Calcio Femminile players
Serie A (women's football) players
People from Portogruaro
Sportspeople from the Metropolitan City of Venice
Footballers from Veneto
A.S.D. AGSM Verona F.C. players
UEFA Women's Euro 2022 players
Italian LGBT sportspeople
LGBT association football players
Lesbian sportswomen
21st-century Italian LGBT people